Mactracker is a freeware application containing a complete database of all Apple hardware models and software versions, created and actively developed by Ian Page. The database includes (by no means exhaustive) the Lisa (under its later name, Macintosh XL), Classic Macintosh (1984–1996), printers, scanners, QuickTake digital cameras, iSight, iPod, iPhone, iPad, Apple Watch, AirPort, along with all versions of the Classic Mac OS, macOS, and iOS. For each model of desktop and portable computer, audio clips of the corresponding startup chime or chime of death are also included.

Sources for the history and text used in Mactracker are credited to Lukas Foljanty, Glen. D Sanford, and English Wikipedia. WidgetWidget and The Iconfactory provided many icons of the hardware. Versions are available for macOS and iOS (both iPhone and iPad run the same universal application which adapts to the device). Versions for Windows and the clickwheel iPod have been discontinued.

Reviews
Macworld: 5 mice
MacUpdate: 5 stars (user reviews)
VersionTracker: 5 stars (user reviews)

References

External links
 – official site

Utilities for macOS
IOS software
IPod software